Live at the Royal Festival Hall is an album by pianists Jaki Byard and Howard Riley.

Background
American pianist Jaki Byard first met British pianist Howard Riley at a jazz club in New York. Riley recommended Byard for an Arts Council tour in the UK; the concert that gave rise to this album was part of that tour.

Recording and music
The album was recorded in concert at the Royal Festival Hall in London on August 29, 1984. Riley commented that the pair utilised compositions and their harmonies, so the performances were not freely improvised. The first track is played by Riley solo; the following two are played by Byard alone. The final two tracks are compositions by Thelonious Monk and are duets. The album was produced by Leo Feigin and released on LP by Leo Records.

Track listing
"T.S.M. (With Thanks)" / "Imprint" / "Circle Cycle" (Howard Riley) – 15:41
"Peggy's Blue Skylight" (Charles Mingus) – 4:10
"European Episode" (Jaki Byard) – 5:20
"Round Midnight (Thelonious Monk)
"Straight, No Chaser (Monk)

Personnel
Jaki Byard – piano
Howard Riley – piano

References

1984 albums
Jaki Byard albums